The 2018 FIA GTC season was the inaugural season of the FIA-Certified Gran Turismo Championships (FIA GTC), a professional esports league for the racing video game Gran Turismo Sport, managed by Japanese developer Polyphony Digital and French governing body Fédération Internationale de l'Automobile. The series concurrently runs two championships in the duration of the season, in the form of the Nations Cup (entrants from their respective countries will represent them) and the Manufacturers Series (entrants will race for and represent their chosen manufacturer).

The season opening event began in 10 May at Nürburg, and concluded at Monaco with the season world final. Igor Fraga was crowned the inaugural Nations Cup champion, and the trio of Kanata Kawakami, Tyrell Meadows, and Vincent Rigaud became the inaugural Manufacturers Series champions with Lexus at the World Final event.

Format 
A phase dubbed as the "Online Series", which is essentially a qualification phase to decide the participants that will race in the live events of the championship tournament, kicks off every season. The Online Series is divided into four stages, with each stage hosting ten rounds. By the end of each stage, another World Tour event is hosted, which includes the top players from that stage instead of the top drivers from the previous season. The top players who are selected after the series must sign an application form in order to be able to participate for the World Tour events, and they must also be over 18. The Online Series goes on for five to seven months. The winner from the World Tour event gains direct access to the "World Final" event.

The "Live Events" begin after the Online Series. The Nations Cup category includes the top 90 players (30 per region) with the highest points across all four stages. Three different live events occur, with each live event carrying a specific world region. The top 10 players from those regions enter the "World Final" event, a championship stage to decide the number one player. The Manufacturer Series category includes the top 48 players (three players per region) and 16 manufacturers with the highest points across all four stages. The top players and manufacturers participate in the "World Final" event, to decide the top three players and the number one manufacturer. The winners of their respective series at the "World Final" are crowned either Nations Cup champion or Manufacturer Series champion.

Series calendar 
The series was set in six locations around the world.

Series results

World Tour 2018 - Nürburgring

GT World Tour | Red Bull Hangar-7

Nations Cup Asia/Oceania Final 2018

Nations Cup European Final 2018

Nations Cup Americas Final 2018

World Finals 2018

References 

Gran Turismo (series) competitions
2018 in esports